Pablo de Torres (died 1560) was a Roman Catholic prelate who served as Bishop of Panamá (1546–1560).

Biography
Pablo de Torres was born in Spain and ordained a priest in the Order of Preachers. On January 27, 1546, Pope Paul III, appointed him Bishop of Panamá. On December 15, 1553, Jerónimo de Loayza, Archbishop of Lima, initiated a case for his removal from his duties due to administrative incompetency and the failure to protect the Indians from abuse and enslavement. Pablo de Torres returned to Rome in 1554 where he is said to have died in 1560.

References

External links and additional sources
 (for Chronology of Bishops) 
 (for Chronology of Bishops) 

1560 deaths
Bishops appointed by Pope Paul III
Dominican bishops
16th-century Roman Catholic bishops in Panama
Roman Catholic bishops of Panamá